Diocletian was a Roman emperor who ruled from 284–305 AD. 

Diocletian may also refer to:

Architecture
Aqueduct of Diocletian, a Roman aqueduct near Split, Croatia
Baths of Diocletian, a bath complex in Rome, Italy
Camp of Diocletian, a military complex at Palmyra, Syria
Diocletian's Palace, an ancient fortress which forms the core of the modern town of Split, Croatia
Diocletian window, large windows characteristic of Ancient Roman bath complexes

Other uses
Diocletian (band), a war metal band from New Zealand
Dioclesian, a tragicomic semi-opera by Henry Purcell

See also
 Diocletianopolis (disambiguation)